Barry Drive is a major arterial road in Canberra, the capital city of Australia. The road forms part of the most direct route between the city centre,  Belconnen Town Centre and Calvary Hospital, as well as providing access to the Australian National University and laboratories of the Commonwealth Scientific and Industrial Research Organisation. Barry Drive defines the boundary between the suburbs of Acton and Turner. The road skirts the foot of Black Mountain and joins Belconnen Way in the Canberra Nature Park. Barry Drive, along with Belconnen Way was constructed between 1965 and 1971 as a single carriageway road. It was progressively upgraded to dual carriageways as traffic volumes grew. As a major transport corridor, many ACTION bus routes transit Barry Drive including cross-city route R4.

Barry Drive was named after Sir Redmond Barry, an Irish-born Victorian judge and inaugural Chancellor of the University of Melbourne.

See also

References

Streets in Canberra